Eugène Ernest Marie Henri Moreau de Melen (20 August 1902 – 31 May 1992) was a Belgian soldier and politician, most notable for holding the position of Minister of Justice and Minister of Defence. He resigned his office and served with the Belgian battalion during the Korean War (1950–1953).

Background and personal life
Henri Moreau de Melen came from the Liège region of Belgium. His father, Eugène Moreau, was a professor at the University of Liège. His mother was Marie Malherbe. Henri studied for a law degree and practiced as a lawyer in Liège. In 1940, at the outbreak of World War II he was conscripted into the Belgian Army. He was taken prisoner by German forces, and held as a prisoner of war until 1945.

He married Marie-Louise Ancion (1904–63) in 1931. After her death, he re-married in 1970 to Countess Jacqueline de Lalaing (1910–2006). He had no children.

Career and Resignation
Henri Moreau de Melen began a political career in 1946 with his election as a member of the Senate in which he represented the interests of the District of Liège as a member of the Christian Social Party (PSC).

He served as Justice Minister between 1948 and 1949. During his tenure as Minister of Defence under the government of Joseph Pholien, the decision was taken to send Belgian forces to fight in the Korean War. Moreau de Melen was a staunch royalist, and was so disillusioned by the resignation of Leopold III in August 1950 following the "Royal Question" that he resigned his ministerial post to enlist in the Belgian battalion sent to aide South Korea.

He served in Korea with distinction with the rank of Major of the Reserve, second-in-command of the entire unit. He finished the war with the rank of lieutenant-colonel. He had a Brevet état-major.

After his return from Korea, he returned to politics and resumed his position as senator for Liège which he held until 1968. In 1968, in recognition of his service to Belgium, he was ennobled and given the title "Baron".

Reading
 Henri Moreau de Melen, Mémoires. Au terme de la route, 1988.
 Thierry Grosbois, Moreau de Melen. Mémoires: de Léopold III à la Corée, Racine, Brussels 2009.

References

External links 
 Henri Moreau de Melen in ODIS - Online Database for Intermediary Structures 

Belgian military personnel of the Korean War
Military personnel from Liège
1902 births
1992 deaths
Christian Social Party (Belgium, defunct) politicians
20th-century Belgian politicians
Barons of Belgium
Belgian military personnel of World War II
Belgian Ministers of Justice
Belgian Ministers of Defence
Belgian prisoners of war in World War II
Belgian Army personnel
World War II prisoners of war held by Germany
Politicians from Liège